The 1987 Navarrese regional election was held on Wednesday, 10 June 1987, to elect the 2nd Parliament of the Chartered Community of Navarre. All 50 seats in the Parliament were up for election. The election was held simultaneously with regional elections in twelve other autonomous communities and local elections all throughout Spain, as well as the 1987 European Parliament election.

The Spanish Socialist Workers' Party (PSOE), under then-incumbent President Gabriel Urralburu, won the election for a second consecutive term, albeit with a diminished share of the vote (27.7%, losing nearly 8 percentage points from 1983) and losing 5 seats. The centre-right spectrum stood divided to the election: the Navarrese People's Union (UPN) maintained its second place with 24.5% and 14 seats (gaining one); the Foral Democrat Union (UDF), an alliance between the People's Democratic Party (PDP) and the Liberal Party (PL), formed after the breakup of the People's Coalition, obtained 6.2% and 3 seats. The People's Alliance (AP) suffered from this division and fell to 7th place (4.2% and 2 seats).

The Democratic and Social Centre (CDS), the party of former Spanish Prime Minister Adolfo Suárez, benefitted from this division and finished fourth, gaining 4 seats. Meanwhile, the left-wing Herri Batasuna (HB) also improved its position from 1983 and scored one of the best results for the abertzale left in Navarre. Eusko Alkartasuna (EA), a split from the Basque Nationalist Party (PNV) formed in 1986 from PNV dissidents, entered the Parliament with 4 seats, while the small Eusko Alkartasuna also entered for the first time.

Overview

Electoral system
The Parliament of Navarre was the devolved, unicameral legislature of the Chartered Community of Navarre, having legislative power in regional matters as defined by the Spanish Constitution and the Reintegration and Enhancement of the Foral Regime of Navarre Law, as well as the ability to vote confidence in or withdraw it from a regional president.

Voting was on the basis of universal suffrage, which comprised all nationals over 18 years of age, registered in Navarre and in full enjoyment of their political rights. The 50 members of the Parliament of Navarre were elected using the D'Hondt method and a closed list proportional representation, with a threshold of three percent of valid votes—which included blank ballots—being applied regionally. Parties not reaching the threshold were not taken into consideration for seat distribution.

The electoral law provided that parties, federations, coalitions and groupings of electors were allowed to present lists of candidates. However, groupings of electors were required to secure the signature of at least 1 percent of the electors registered in Navarre. Electors were barred from signing for more than one list of candidates. Concurrently, parties and federations intending to enter in coalition to take part jointly at an election were required to inform the relevant Electoral Commission within ten days of the election being called.

Election date
The term of the Parliament of Navarre expired four years after the date of its previous election. The election decree was required to be issued no later than the twenty-fifth day prior to the date of expiry of parliament and published on the following day in the Official Gazette of Navarre (BON), with election day taking place between the fifty-fourth and the sixtieth day from publication. The previous election was held on 8 May 1983, which meant that the legislature's term would have expired on 8 May 1987. The election decree was required to be published in the BON no later than 14 April 1987, with the election taking place no later than the sixtieth day from publication, setting the latest possible election date for the Parliament on Saturday, 13 June 1987.

The Parliament of Navarre could not be dissolved before the date of expiry of parliament. In the event of an investiture process failing to elect a regional president within a two-month period from the first ballot, the candidate from the party with the highest number of seats was to be deemed automatically elected.

Opinion polls
The tables below list opinion polling results in reverse chronological order, showing the most recent first and using the dates when the survey fieldwork was done, as opposed to the date of publication. Where the fieldwork dates are unknown, the date of publication is given instead. The highest percentage figure in each polling survey is displayed with its background shaded in the leading party's colour. If a tie ensues, this is applied to the figures with the highest percentages. The "Lead" column on the right shows the percentage-point difference between the parties with the highest percentages in a poll.

Voting intention estimates
The table below lists weighted voting intention estimates. Refusals are generally excluded from the party vote percentages, while question wording and the treatment of "don't know" responses and those not intending to vote may vary between polling organisations. When available, seat projections determined by the polling organisations are displayed below (or in place of) the percentages in a smaller font; 26 seats were required for an absolute majority in the Parliament of Navarre.

Voting preferences
The table below lists raw, unweighted voting preferences.

Victory preferences
The table below lists opinion polling on the victory preferences for each party in the event of a regional election taking place.

Victory likelihood
The table below lists opinion polling on the perceived likelihood of victory for each party in the event of a regional election taking place.

Preferred President
The table below lists opinion polling on leader preferences to become president of the Foral Deputation of Navarre.

Results

Aftermath
Investiture processes to elect the President of the Government of Navarre required for an absolute majority—more than half the votes cast—to be obtained in the first ballot. If unsuccessful, a new ballot would be held 48 hours later under the same majority requirement, with successive votes requiring only of a simple majority—more affirmative than negative votes—to succeed. If such majorities were not achieved, successive candidate proposals would be processed under the same procedure. In the event of the investiture process failing to elect a regional President within a two-month period from the first ballot, the candidate from the party with the highest number of seats was deemed to be automatically elected.

As a result of the investiture process failing to provide a regional President within two months from the first ballot, Gabriel Urralburu was automatically elected on 30 September 1987 and officially sworn into office on 8 October.

Notes

References
Opinion poll sources

Other

1987 in Navarre
Navarre
Regional elections in Navarre
June 1987 events in Europe